Mount Tahat is the highest mountain peak in Algeria. It sits at an elevation of 2,908 metres (9,541 ft). Tahat is also the highest peak in the Hoggar Mountains.

Mount Tahat is of volcanic origin. It is located in an arid, rocky high plateau area of the central Sahara Desert. The Tuareg inhabit this region. To the north lie the Tassili n'Ajjer mountains, which contain cave paintings dating from a period between 8000 and 2000 BC. The rock art is pastoral, showing cattle breeding and hunting of animals that are today exclusively found in the southern Sahara's climate.

See also
 List of Ultras of Africa
 Atakor volcanic field

References

External links
 Mount Tahat Virtual Aerial Video

Tahat
Tahat
Sahara
Tuareg
Highest points of countries